The Hungarian Women's Curling Championship is the national championship of women's curling teams in Hungary. It has been held annually since 2003.

List of champions and medallists
Teams line-up in order: fourth, third, second, lead, alternate; skips marked bold.

References

See also
Hungarian Men's Curling Championship
Hungarian Mixed Doubles Curling Championship
Hungarian Mixed Curling Championship

Curling competitions in Hungary
Curling
Recurring sporting events established in 2003
2003 establishments in Hungary
National curling championships